The 1929–30 season was Manchester United's 34th season in the Football League.

First Division

FA Cup

References

Manchester United F.C. seasons
Manchester United